This is a list of public art in the London Borough of Brent.


Dollis Hill

Kilburn

Neasden

Sudbury

Wembley

Willesden

References

Bibliography

External links
 

Brent
Public art
Public art